American actor and comedian Robin Williams (1951–2014) starred in films, television and video games throughout a career that spanned nearly four decades. Known for his fast-paced, improvisational style and playing a wide variety of characters, he was described by Screen Actors Guild president Ken Howard as "a performer of limitless versatility, equally adept at comedy and drama, whether scripted or improv". He is often regarded as one of the greatest comedians of all time.

Williams's career began in 1977 with minor roles in the film Can I Do It... 'Til I Need Glasses? and the television shows The Richard Pryor Show and Laugh-In. The guest role of an alien named Mork in an episode of the sitcom Happy Days in 1978 earned him positive reviews, and led to the spin-off Mork & Mindy, focusing on his character's experience on Earth. Running for four seasons, the show was Williams's breakthrough and earned him his first Golden Globe Award and a nomination for a Primetime Emmy Award. By the early 1980s, Williams wanted to do mainstream acting, and made his film debut in a lead role in the musical comedy Popeye (1980), a critical failure that earned thrice its budget. Williams then took on more serious parts in the comedy-dramas The World According to Garp (film) (1982) and Moscow on the Hudson (1984). He garnered two consecutive Primetime Emmy Awards for Outstanding Individual Performance in a Variety or Music Program for the television specials Carol, Carl, Whoopi and Robin (1987) and ABC Presents A Royal Gala (1988). He earned his first of three Academy Award for Best Actor nominations for playing disc jockey Adrian Cronauer in the war comedy Good Morning, Vietnam (1987), in which he improvised some of his scenes.

Further critical praise followed with Williams's lead roles in Dead Poets Society (1989), Awakenings (1990) and The Fisher King (1991). He also found greater commercial success in the 1990s. Many of his films during this period earned more than $100million, including the fantasy Hook (1991), the animated musical Aladdin (1992), the comedy-drama Mrs. Doubtfire (1993),  the adventure Jumanji (1995) and the comedy The Birdcage (1996). Aladdin, in which he improvised 52 characters, was the highest-grossing film of the year. Mrs. Doubtfire, which he also produced, earned him a third Golden Globe Award for Best Actor – Motion Picture Musical or Comedy; he previously won for Good Morning, Vietnam and The Fisher King. Although he was hailed "the funniest person alive" by Entertainment Weekly in 1997, he wanted to do more serious work as an actor around this time. Such opportunities arose with the roles of a therapist in the psychological drama Good Will Hunting (1997) and a man in heaven who attempts to save his wife from hell in the fantasy drama What Dreams May Come (1998). The former won him an Academy Award for Best Supporting Actor.

In the 2000s, Williams continued to do voice roles, including in A.I. Artificial Intelligence (2001), Robots (2005) and Happy Feet (2006, and its 2011 sequel). Pursuing more diverse parts, he took on the darker roles of an emotionally disturbed photo developer in One Hour Photo (2002), a writer of pulp novels in Insomnia (2002) and a radio host who is caught up with a troubled fan in The Night Listener (2006). He returned to comedy in 2006 with the satire Man of the Year and the fantasy Night at the Museum. The latter was the fifth-highest-grossing film of the year and spawned two sequels in 2009 and 2014. He began touring for the one-man stand-up comedy show Weapons of Self Destruction (2008), focusing on "social and political absurdities", and starred in the Disney film Old Dogs (2009). In the 2010s, he starred in the sitcom The Crazy Ones (2013–2014), played supporting roles in the 2013 features The Big Wedding and The Butler, and had three films released posthumously, including the sequel Night at the Museum: Secret of the Tomb.

Film

Television

Theatre

Video games

Video recordings

See also
List of awards and nominations received by Robin Williams

References

Sources

External links
 

Male actor filmographies
American filmographies